Nowy Duninów  is a village in Płock County, Masovian Voivodeship, in east-central Poland. It is the seat of the gmina (administrative district) called Gmina Nowy Duninów, a rural area.

Geography
Nowy Duninów is located on the Vistula a few kilometers northwest of Stary Duninów (Old Duninów), at the intersection of Route 62 (DK-62) and Route 573 (DW-573). It has port facilities, which are now mostly for water-sports enthusiasts.

History
A sugar mill was founded at Nowy Duninów in 1846 for processing sugar beets, as it had a good port for agricultural transport. Among the other industries in the village in the early 20th century were distilleries, a brickyard, a sawmill and fish farms.

Castle
It's Neogothic "pocket castle" was built from 1835 to 1840 by Karol Albrecht Wilhelm Baron von Ike, and served various functions over its long history from being a chapel, a cinema and a hotel.  In 1959 it became a "registered monument". By the late 1980s it had fallen into disrepair when in 1992 it was remodeled as a private residence.

Notes and references

Villages in Płock County